Harvey Smith (born June 2, 1945) is an American politician in the state of Vermont. He is a member of the Vermont House of Representatives, sitting as a Republican from the Addison-5 district, having been first elected in 2010. He also previously served from 1999 to 2006.

References

1945 births
Living people
Politicians from Nashua, New Hampshire
People from New Haven, Vermont
University of New Hampshire alumni
21st-century American politicians
Republican Party members of the Vermont House of Representatives